Burrum Town is a rural locality in the Fraser Coast Region, Queensland, Australia.

Geography
The Burrum River forms the north-western boundary.

References 

Fraser Coast Region
Localities in Queensland